In Pakistan, in the summer of 2019, more than 47 people have died and more than 30,000 have been infected by Dengue fever.

In October, Prime Minister Imran Khan took notice of the dengue outbreak in the country and sought report from the Special Assistant to Prime Minister on National Health Services Dr. Zafar Mirza.

On 10 October 2019, a Peshawar High Court bench sent summons to the Khyber Pakhtunkhwa's provincial health secretary to explain the situation related to dengue outbreak in parts of the province.

As of November 2019, record 44,000 cases were reported in the country with 67 deaths. In December the death toll risen to 91 with total number of cases on 52,485.

See also
 2011 dengue outbreak in Pakistan
 2017 dengue outbreak in Peshawar

References

Disease outbreaks in Pakistan
Dengue outbreak in Pakistan, 2019
2019 disease outbreaks
Pakistan
Imran Khan administration